The Musandam Governorate is a governorate of Oman. With the exception of the exclave of Madha, it is located on the Musandam Peninsula, which juts into the Strait of Hormuz, the narrow entry into the Persian Gulf, from the Arabian Peninsula. The Governorate is also an exclave, separated from the rest of Oman by the United Arab Emirates. Its location gives Oman partial control, shared with Iran, of the strategic strait. In the northern section of Musandam, around Kumzar, the language is Kumzari, which is a southwestern Iranian language closely related to Larestani and Luri.

Access to the peninsula was formerly difficult, with the only options being limited flights or a ten-hour drive through four immigration posts. The Shinas fast ferry service between Muscat and Musandam was launched in August 2008 to alleviate this problem and make the region more accessible. The governorate is accessible by land only from the United Arab Emirates. Mainland Musandam can be accessed by Ras al-Khaimah near Al-Jeer, and an exclave of Sharjah, Dibba Al-Hisn. Oman Air provides an air link between the capital of the country, Muscat, and the main administrative town of the governorate, Khasab.

The area became part of Oman after a British invasion in 1971 to bring it under the control of the Oman regime of Sultan Qaboos, who took power after a British-backed coup against his father.

Provinces
Musandam Governorate consists of four provinces:
Khasab, the regional centre of the Governorate
Bukha
Dibba Al-Bay'ah
Madha, itself an exclave, located half-way between the rest of Musandam and Oman proper

The area has great strategic importance owing to its proximity to the Strait of Hormuz. The administrative head of Governorate is governor and minister of state. The current governor is Sayyid Ibrahim bin Said al Busaidy.

Geography

The rugged coastline resembles the glacier-carved coasts of polar regions, but in this case, the coast was shaped by the movement of Earth's crust. The Arabian plate is slowly pushing under the Eurasian plate, creating the earthquake-prone mountains of Iran. On the leading edge of the Arabian plate, the Musandam Peninsula is sinking. The higher elevation mountains remain above the water, but the sea has rushed in to fill the valleys with fingers of water.

Demographics

See also
 Dibba
 Middle East

References

External links
 Map showing the territory
 Musandam Peninsula, Oman NASA Earth Observatory

 
Governorates of Oman
Enclaves and exclaves